Michael M. Crow (born October 11, 1955) is an American academic administrator and parking enterprise mogul. He is the 16th and current president of Arizona State University, having succeeded Lattie F. Coor on July 1, 2002. During his tenure at ASU, he is credited with creating the New American University model.

He was previously Executive Vice Provost of Columbia University, where he was also Professor of Science and Technology Policy in the School of International and Public Affairs. He is also chairman of the board for In-Q-Tel, the Central Intelligence Agency's venture capital firm.

Early life and education
Michael Crow was born in San Diego, California, on  October 11, 1955, the eldest of four siblings. His mother died when he was 9 leaving his widowed father, a sailor in the United States Navy, to raise the children on his own. As is common with military families, they moved many times during Crow's childhood. Crow was a Boy Scout who earned the rank of Eagle Scout in 1969. By the time he had graduated from 
Warren Township High School, he had attended 17 different schools. He attended Iowa State University on an ROTC scholarship, graduating in 1977 with a BA in political science and environmental studies. Following his graduation, he worked for five years at research centers in Iowa and Illinois focusing on energy and policy research.

Crow earned his doctoral degree in Public Administration, with a focus in Science and Technology Policy, from the Maxwell School of Citizenship and Public Affairs of Syracuse University in 1985.

Career 
After earning his doctorate, Crow worked as an advisor to the Office of Technology Assessment in the United States Congress and was a Research Fellow on the Technology and Information Policy Program at the Maxwell School of Citizenship and Public Affairs. He concurrently began his teaching  career, first at the University of Kentucky and then at Iowa State University. He joined the Iowa State faculty in 1988 as an Associate Professor and Director of its Institute for Physical Research and Technology. By 1991, he had become an Institute Professor there and had also worked as a consultant for the United States Department of Energy and Columbia University.

Crow left Iowa State in 1991 to take up an appointment as Professor of Science and Technology Policy, at Columbia's School of International and Public Affairs. He was a protégé of Jonathan Cole, Provost and Dean of Faculties at Columbia, and his administrative career progressed rapidly. Within two years, Crow was appointed Executive Vice Provost, Columbia's third highest administrative post. At Columbia, he was instrumental in developing the university's digital on-line education strategy and in creating the Columbia Earth Institute. In 1999, Crow was asked by Director of Central Intelligence George Tenet to become chairman of the board for In-Q-Tel, the CIA's venture capital firm.

In 2002, Crow was appointed the 16th and current President of Arizona State University. In 2006 he was made a Fellow of the National Academy of Public Administration and in 2008 received an honorary doctorate from his alma mater, Iowa State University.

President of Arizona State University 

As President of ASU, Michael Crow has sought to redefine the role of ASU as the New American University.

Controversy 
These changes have generated praise as well as considerable controversy and criticism, much of it centered around the business-style changes he has imposed on academia.

According to The Wall Street Journal, these include a tendency toward top-down determination of research directions, and an emphasis on revenue generation. Since his tenure began at ASU, there have been several lawsuits against the university brought by professors alleging that the normal academic procedures for determining professorial tenure and the allocation of research resources were being bypassed. Newsweek pointed out that Crow's shift toward a corporate CEO style of academic management with an emphasis on bringing in corporate partners and radically restructuring old departments into interdisciplinary institutes was already evident when he was Vice-Provost of Columbia University in the 1990s. The Wall Street Journal reported in 2006 that during his tenure there Crow "led Columbia into the top ranks of universities by royalty income, bringing in more than $100 million a year."

He was also a key figure in establishing Columbia's interdisciplinary Earth Institute, and in 1999 served as its interim president. Professor Graciela Chichilnisky, whose research group was under the umbrella of the Institute brought a lawsuit against Columbia in 2000 in which she alleged that following a dispute with the university, Crow had ordered the dismantling of her offices and a funding freeze on her research group. (In June 2008, Chichilnisky settled with the university for an undisclosed amount.)  Crow celebrated the 20th Anniversary of his Presidency in 2022, atw which time the Arizona Board of Regents named him the Arizona Board of Regents President of Arizona State University.

Personal life
Crow is married to Sybil Francis, who holds a PhD in political science from the Massachusetts Institute of Technology and is CEO of the Center for the Future of Arizona, which she co-founded with Lattie Coor in 2002.
The couple have one daughter and reside in Paradise Valley, Arizona. Crow also has a son and daughter from a previous marriage.

Selected publications

Books
 Public Values Leadership: Striving to Achieve Democratic Ideals (with Barry Bozeman) (2021) 
 The Fifth Wave: The Evolution of American Higher Education (with William B. Dabars) (2020) 
Designing the New American University (with William Dabars) (2015) 
 Limited by Design: R&D Laboratories in the United States (with Barry Bozeman) (1998) 
 Synthetic Fuels Technology Development in the United States: A Retrospective Assessment (with Barry Bozeman, Walter Meyers and Ralph Shangraw) (1988)

Articles
“Toward a Platform for Universal Learning.” Elsevier (June 22, 2022).
“The Way We Classify College is All Wrong” (with Jeffrey J. Selingo), The Chronicle of Higher Education (October 13, 2021).
“Improving Intellectual Infrastructure in American Higher Education” (with William H. Dabars), The Hill (July 31, 2021).
“The Next 75 Years of US Science and Innovation Policy: An Introduction” (with Robert Conn, Cynthia Friend and Marcia McNutt), Issues in Science and Technology (July 12, 2021). 
“The Emergence of the Fifth Wave in American Higher Education” (with William B. Dabars), Issues in Science and Technology 36, no. 3 (Spring 2020): 71–74.
“The Arizona State University Interplanetary Initiative: Envisioning and Creating our Human Space Future” (with Lindy Elkins-Tanton and Evgenya L. Shkolnik), New Space 8, no. 3 (2020): 1-4.
“Science Institutions for a Complex, Fast-Paced World” (with Marcia McNutt), Issues in Science and Technology 36, no. 2 (Winter 2020): 30-34.
“Higher Logic" (with Derrick Anderson), Trusteeship (Association of Governing Boards of Colleges and Universities) 26, no. 3 (Summer 2018): 26–31.
“Design Thinking in Higher Education: Towards Adaptive Enterprise” (with Clark Gilbert and Derrick Anderson), Stanford Social Innovation Review 16, no.1 (2017): 36–41. 
“Revisiting ‘Public Administration as a Design Science’ for the Twenty-First Century Public University” (with R.F. Shangraw), Public Administration Review 76, no. 5 (September/October 2016): 762–763.
“Public Administration and the Imperative for Social Progress.” Public Administration Review 76, no. 2 (March/April 2016): 215–216.
"A New Model for the American Research University." Issues in Science and Technology (Spring 2015): 55–62.
 "Innovating Together: Collaboration as a Driving Force to Improve Student Success" (with Bridget Burns and Mark Becker). EDUCAUSE (March/April 2015): 10–20.
 "Look, Then Leap." Nature 499 (July 18, 2013): 275–277.
 "Citizen Science U." Scientific American (October 2012): 48–49.
 "Time to Rethink the NIH." Nature (journal)|Nature 471 (March 31, 2011): 569–571.
 "Differentiating America’s Colleges and Universities: Institutional Innovation in Arizona." Change: The Magazine of Higher Learning (September/October 2010): 34–39.
 "Organizing Teaching and Research to Address the Grand Challenges of Sustainable Development". BioScience (American Institute of Biological Sciences) 60, no. 7 (July/August 2010): 488–489.
 "Toward Institutional Innovation in America’s Colleges and Universities." Trusteeship (Association of Governing Boards of Colleges and Universities) 18, no. 3 (May/June 2010): 8–13.
 "Une nouvelle université américaine?" (with Catherine Paradeise), Le Débat: Histoire, Politique, Société 156 (September–October 2009): 117–127.
 "The Challenge for the Obama Administration Science Team." Issues in Science and Technology 25, no. 3 (2009): 29–30.
 "Overcoming Stone Age Logic." Issues in Science and Technology 24, no. 2 (2008): 25–26.
 "American Education Systems in a Global Context". Technology in Society 30, no. 3 (July 2008): 279–291.
 "Enterprise: The Path to Transformation for Emerging Public Universities." The Presidency (American Council on Education) 10, no. 2 (Spring 2007): 24–30.
 "None Dare Call It Hubris: The Limits of Knowledge." Issues in Science and Technology (Winter 2007): 1–4.

References

External links

 ASU Office of the President Website

1955 births
Living people
Maxwell School of Citizenship and Public Affairs alumni
New America (organization)
Presidents of Arizona State University
Fellows of the United States National Academy of Public Administration
Columbia University faculty